Arnold Kent Garr (born June 14, 1944) was the chair of the department of Church History and Doctrine at Brigham Young University (BYU) from 2006 to 2009.  He was also the lead editor of the Encyclopedia of Latter-day Saint History.

Biography 
Garr was born and raised in Ogden, Utah.  As a young man, Garr served a mission for the Church of Jesus Christ of Latter-day Saints (LDS Church) in Finland.  Garr married Cherie Burns in the Salt Lake Temple on November 20, 1967, and they are the parents of five children.

In the LDS Church, among other callings, Garr has served as a bishop, counselor to a stake president, member of a stake high council and branch president.  He served as a member of the Church Correlation Committee from 2001 to 2009.

Late in his life Garr took up running and he completed eleven marathons after turning sixty.

Education
Garr received a bachelor's degree in History from Weber State University, a master's degree in History from Utah State University, and a Ph.D. in American History, minoring in LDS Church history, from BYU in 1986.

Career
Garr began his career with the Church Educational System (CES) as a seminary teacher at Roy High School in Utah.  He later served as director of the Institutes of Religion in Rochester, New York; Boulder, Colorado; and Tallahassee, Florida.  After 21 years with CES, Garr joined the BYU faculty in 1991.  He taught at the BYU Jerusalem Center during 1996–97 and was later the chair of the Department of Church History and Doctrine.

Publications
.
.

Notes

Sources 
 BYU faculty bio

Further reading

External links
 BYU Religious Education Faculty website
 

1944 births
20th-century Mormon missionaries
American Latter Day Saint writers
American Mormon missionaries in Finland
American expatriates in Israel
American leaders of the Church of Jesus Christ of Latter-day Saints
Brigham Young University alumni
Brigham Young University faculty
Church Educational System instructors
Editors of Latter Day Saint publications
Historians of the Latter Day Saint movement
Latter Day Saints from Colorado
Latter Day Saints from Florida
Latter Day Saints from New York (state)
Latter Day Saints from Utah
Living people
Utah State University alumni
Weber State University alumni
Writers from Ogden, Utah